"Boy, I've Been Told" is the first single released by freestyle singer Sa-Fire from her 1988 eponymous debut.

Track listing
US 12" Single

Track listing
US CD Video

Charts

References

1988 singles
Sa-Fire songs
Mercury Records singles
1988 songs
Songs written by Marc Anthony